Phaëtusa (minor planet designation: 296 Phaëtusa) is a small Main belt asteroid. It was discovered by Auguste Charlois on 19 August 1890 in Nice.

References

External links
 
 

Background asteroids
Phaetusa
Phaetusa
S-type asteroids (Tholen)
18900819